August 26th is the debut mixtape by American rapper and singer Post Malone. It was released on May 12, 2016, by Republic Records on DatPiff. The mixtape features guest appearances from Larry June, 2 Chainz, FKi 1st, Jeremih, Lil Yachty, Jaden Smith, and Teo.

Background
The title was initially a reference to the release date of his debut studio album Stoney (2016), however, August 26, 2016, passed without its release. On August 27, 2016, Post Malone issued an apology for the delay of the release of his album, citing several problems, placing a blame on both himself and his team for failing to come through with the album. He concluded the letter by promising the release of the album would materialize soon later in the year. The album was eventually released on December 9, 2016.

The track "Money Made Me Do It" featuring 2 Chainz was included as a bonus track on the deluxe edition of Stoney.

Track listing

Sample credits
"Hollywood Dreams / Comedown" contains samples of "Dreams" (1977), written by Stevie Nicks and performed by Fleetwood Mac.
"40 Funk" contains samples of "Drugs You Should Try It" performed by Travis Scott.

References

External links 
Official download on DatPiff

2016 mixtape albums
Albums produced by FKi (production team)
Albums produced by Louis Bell
Post Malone albums

Albums produced by Post Malone
Republic Records albums